The Hotel Glode is a former hotel building in Eveleth, Minnesota, United States.  It also served as a depot on the Mesaba Railway, active 1912–1927 as the first interurban mass transit system on the Iron Range.  The Hotel Glode was listed on the National Register of Historic Places in 1980 for its local significance in the themes of commerce and transportation.  It was nominated for its role as both an important local hotel and a stop on an early mass transit system.

See also
 National Register of Historic Places listings in St. Louis County, Minnesota

References

1904 establishments in Minnesota
Buildings and structures in St. Louis County, Minnesota
Defunct hotels in Minnesota
Former railway stations in Minnesota
Hotel buildings completed in 1904
Hotel buildings on the National Register of Historic Places in Minnesota
National Register of Historic Places in St. Louis County, Minnesota
Railway stations on the National Register of Historic Places in Minnesota
Railway stations in the United States opened in 1912
Railway stations closed in 1927